Never Say Die is a 1924 American silent comedy film directed by George Crone and starring Douglas MacLean, Lillian Rich, and Helen Ferguson.

Cast

References

Bibliography
 Munden, Kenneth White. The American Film Institute Catalog of Motion Pictures Produced in the United States, Part 1. University of California Press, 1997.

External links

1924 films
1924 comedy films
1920s English-language films
American silent feature films
Silent American comedy films
American black-and-white films
Films directed by George Crone
Associated Exhibitors films
1920s American films